Frank Bramley Watson (September 17, 1898 – February 1, 1976) was an English first-class cricketer from St Helens who played for Lancashire.

One of Lancashire's most prolific batsman, Watson originally batted in the middle order before moving up to opener for the latter part of his career. He made 22,833 runs for the county, with a highest score of 300 not out against Surrey in 1928. In that game he set a second-wicket partnership of 371 with Ernest Tyldesley which remains a Lancashire record to this day. He finished the 1928 season with 2,583 runs, his highest tally.

References

External links
 
 

1898 births
1976 deaths
Cricketers from Nottingham
English cricketers of 1919 to 1945
English cricketers
Lancashire cricketers
Marylebone Cricket Club cricketers
North v South cricketers
Players cricketers